Sila Nikolaevich Sandunov, born Silovan Nikolozis dze Zandukeli, (born 1756— Died 1820) was a businessman and actor of Georgian origin active at the court of Catherine the Great. Sandunov's family emigrated from Georgia to Russia proper as part of an entourage accompanying the exiled Georgian monarch Vakhtang VI.

Life 
Sandunov is best remembered today as the founder of the eponymous Sanduny Baths, an architectural and cultural landmark of downtown Moscow. The businessman started his investment in the baths by selling diamonds he had received as a wedding gift from Empress Catherine, who personally attended the wedding ceremony at the royal chapel.

Sandunov was married to mezzo-soprano Elizabeth Sandunova.

References 

Russian people of Georgian descent
18th-century male actors from the Russian Empire
1756 births
1820 deaths
18th-century businesspeople from the Russian Empire
19th-century male actors from the Russian Empire
19th-century businesspeople from the Russian Empire